A bomb threat or bomb scare is a threat, usually verbal or written, to detonate an explosive or incendiary device to cause property damage, death, injuries, and/or incite fear, whether or not such a device actually exists.

History
Bomb threats were used to incite fear and violence during the American Civil Rights Movement, during which leader of the movement Martin Luther King Jr. received multiple bomb threats during public addresses, and schools forced to integrate faced strong opposition, resulting in 43 bomb threats against Central High School in Arkansas being broadcast on TV and the radio.

Motivations
Supposed motives for bomb threats include: "humor, self assertion, anger, manipulation, aggression, hate and devaluation, omnipotence, fantasy, psychotic distortion, ideology, retaliation," and creating chaos. Many of the motives based on personal emotion are speculative.  Many bomb threats that are not pranks are made as parts of other crimes, such as extortion, arson, or aircraft hijacking. Actual bombings for malicious destruction of property, terrorism, or murder are often perpetrated without warning.

Ideological
Bomb threats may be motivated by political or religious ideology and ideological differences, including political party and criticism, abortion, animal testing, eco-terrorism, and use of nuclear power. The aim of these threats is to draw attention to certain causes or incite fear and unrest among those who support causes in opposition to the threatener's views, Some threats are racially-motivated, while others are made against houses of worship or research and medical facilities.

Extortion
Bomb threats made as part of extortion schemes demand some form of bribe, payment, or incentive to prevent the use of a bomb. The payment can be made in the form of cash, Bitcoin, or forcing the victim to adhere to demands.

Hoax device
Because of the potential for loss of life, injury, and property damage of a bomb detonation, bomb threats are treated as realistic and maliciously intended by authorities until proven otherwise. Bomb threats made as jokes or pranks, especially those made against schools, cause thousands of dollars in law enforcement costs, government resources, and lost educational time annually. These threats may be made as distractions or disruptions, forcing school officials to cancel or postpone planned activities such as exams. Related to an actual bomb is a so-called "hoax device", designed to cause a reasonable person to assume the item was a truly destructive device capable of causing injury or death.

False flag
False flag bomb threats are made to create the appearance of a specific group or person being responsible for an activity to disguise the true perpetrators.

Political
It can happen as part of politically-motivated operations, for example when it was reportedly used as a pretext by the Belarusian government to divert Ryanair Flight 4978 to Minsk in order to arrest opposition figure Raman Pratasevich. As a result the nation was accused of committing state terrorism.

Targets

Schools and universities
Bomb threats are often made toward educational institutions, typically by students who either feel under stress due to academic pressure or who harbor angry or violent emotions toward the school community or members of it. In the United States, roughly 5% of bomb threats targeted schools, and bomb threats made against schools have increased by 33% since 2014. The penalty for bomb threats on a school campus is usually immediate expulsion. 

In 2013, final exams at Harvard University were disrupted by an anonymous threat of a "shrapnel bomb" that turned out to have been authored by 20-year-old student Eldo Kim who hoped to avoid taking his final exam. Kim agreed to pay restitution to law enforcement agencies, complete a rehabilitative "diversionary program," remain under home confinement for several months, and perform community service.

Public figures
Bomb threats against political figures such as the President of the United States, occur regularly and are illegal under the United States Code Title 18, Section 871 law.

The British royal family, specifically Queen Elizabeth, has faced bomb threats based on blame for the actions of the British government. Celebrities may also be the victims of bomb threats, especially those who have expressed political views, or those who are leaders of political causes. Author Salman Rushdie and his publisher faced multiple bomb threats from Islamic fundamentalist groups because of his controversial book The Satanic Verses, which was interpreted by these groups as opposing Muslim ideology.

Government and public infrastructure

Many buildings are the recipients of bomb threats, including transportation hubs such as airports and train stations, power plants, medical facilities, and government buildings such as the Pentagon, the US Embassy, and the Casa Rosada. Among these, airports, city halls, and courthouses are most likely to experience repeated bomb threats. Among bomb threats related to transportation, threats and false information knowingly provided about bombs on airplanes have the most severe response.

Private institutions/businesses
Private institutions and businesses, including as banks, department stores, malls, casinos, restaurants, manufacturing plants, and truck stops, have been the recipients of bomb threats for various reasons. Some bomb threats are made because of ideological differences or opposition to the mission or perceived mission of the institution, such as those made against Planned Parenthood and abortion clinics, news organizations such as CNN, or nuclear facilities. From 1983 to 1992, the World Trade Center experienced roughly 350 bomb threats and scares for various reasons.

Some threats are motivated by money, involving an offender demanding a payoff from a bank or department store over a public phone. Other reasons for attacking a restaurant or shopping center include revenge or vandalism, the primary motives found in a study analyzing 69 Finnish offenders.

Methods
A majority of bomb threats are perpetrated by middle-aged men who make these threats via a telephone call. Different types of offenders tend to call the target directly on a public phone to demand money, call directly on a personal line because of resentment, or call emergency service lines and make threats for personal entertainment.

Bomb threats may also be made by text message, as in the case of a March 2004 message to a private operator sending a warning of bombs in five Washington, D.C. schools, and February 2014 messages to school employees of Ateneo de Manila University.

Bomb threats may be made in letters or notes, delivered either personally or through the mail system. Packages intended to mimic or represent bombs, including backpacks, luggage, bags, or attache cases, even if they may not have the capability of exploding because of poor construction or intentional choices, are still treated as potential explosives, as in the case of 13 devices mailed to various politicians and opponents of Donald Trump.

Electronic bomb threats may be made over websites, email, or social media, as in the case of the emailed wave of 2018 Bitcoin bomb threats in the United States and Canada. A series of mail bombs sent to celebrities based on their political ideologies was found to have been preceded by threats on Twitter.

They can also be made face-to-face.

Indirect threats
Many activities treated as bomb threats do not explicitly state an intent to set off an explosive; nevertheless, they convey through context or action that a threat is being made. Some actions may indicate an intent to bomb, such as parking a truck outside an abortion clinic, after a similar bombing made by the same vehicle. In other scenarios, a message mentioning bombs may be interpreted as a threat based on context, such as an email to a school principal reading "bomb," a statement that a bomb exists in a specific location, the expression of a desire to build a bomb, a description of a bomb that was placed, or other communications.

Credibility and response
Most bomb threats are false alarms which do not involve actual explosives, only the incitement of fear. There are more bomb threats than incidents, with only 14 of 1,055 school incidents recorded from 1990 to 2002 being preceded by threats. According to the Hunter-Howler threat dynamic, the group of people who make bomb threats is largely separate from those who attempt a real bombing, which typically occurs without warning.

Standard procedure is usually to take all threats seriously because civilians are usually threatened by them if valid as well as the community, and arrests may be made even for bomb threats made falsely as in most jurisdictions even hoaxes are a crime. Signs that a threat is legitimate include an out-of-place object found, a motive or specific targets being stated, and multiple calls or specific threats being made.

Police and bomb disposal professionals are typically alerted to respond to bomb threat incidents to assess and mitigate potential harm. Schools and government organizations offer instructions and sometimes training for both bomb prevention planning and response to assist those facing bomb threats. Organizations involved in responding to a bomb threat may also include anti-terrorism government agencies, fire departments, and other emergency services.

The decision to evacuate an area or building, depending on the perceived reliability of the threat, may be made by local controlling authorities or those in charge of the targeted facility based on advice from bomb disposal experts. When a large facility is involved, it can be very difficult and time-consuming to ensure the absence of any bomb or other hazardous device or substance. A search is conducted for out-of-place packages that have features such as unusual shapes, sounds, smells, leakage, or electrical components. Bomb-sniffing dogs may be used as part of this search. Forensic evidence and law enforcement searches are then used to attempt to locate the perpetrator.

Law
While the terms "bomb threat" and "bomb scare" are often used interchangeably, a bomb threat in the legal context is typically in the form of a statement, or some "communicated intent to inflict harm," whereas a "bomb scare" refers to situations of imminent risk, such as the discovery of a suspicious bag. These are both distinct from false statements knowingly made about bombs, which are sometimes also criminalized.

Some statutory definitions include the threatened use, release or placement of other harmful agents, such as poisons, biological pathogens, radioactive materials, or even a dangerous weapon (e.g., aboard an airliner). Other statutes enhance the penalties for threats made against specific places or persons (e.g. government facilities or dignitaries), and the actual possession of harmful devices or agents. Prosecution of making a bomb threat hinges only on the victim's reasonable belief of the threat's veracity rather than the actual existence of a dangerous device.

United States

A total of 1536 bomb threat incidents took place in the US in 2016, 254 of which were made against businesses and 186 of which were made to residences. Criminal statutes typically dictate severe penalties. For example, in the United States, Massachusetts provides for penalties of up to 20 years in prison, up to $50,000 fine, and restitution for the costs of the disruption. New York law makes it a "Class E Felony ... to issue a false bomb threat directed toward a school in New York State." Even a false bomb threat has a maximum fine of $5,000 and up to 5 years in prison. In Orange County in North Carolina, a person may face "a felony charge, a 365-day suspension, revocation of his or her driver’s license, and a civil lawsuit of up to $25,000."

The current federal law regarding bomb threats applies to a person who "threatens by any means the placement or setting of a weapon of mass destruction." Although there is some contention as to whether the law is overly broad, some current statutes making bomb threats illegal do not define a "threat," as a "true threat", meaning that the intent to use an actual bomb, the existence of a target, or the ability to convince the recipient that a bomb exists, is not relevant. This is because verbal acts which inherently cause panic are not protected under Freedom of speech. However, other sentencing guidelines apply only to "defendants whose conduct evidenced an intent to carry out the threat"

Society
Bomb threats are likely influenced by the power of suggestion and mass media, with threats likely to be made against targets with recent media coverage. Analysis suggests bomb threats against nuclear energy facilities tend to follow greater publicity of nuclear power problems. In the 6 months after the 1999 Columbine High School massacre, there were a reported 5,000 bomb threats made against schools, with hundreds more made every year. Before 1999, there were roughly 1 to 2 threats a year, but by May 1999 a Gallup poll showed one fifth of teenage students experiencing a bomb threat evacuation. Because of copycat trends, some schools are moving toward policies of immediate criminal action against students caught making such threats, regardless of motivation. In addition, the FBI has created a campaign, namely “#ThinkBeforeYouPost”, and warns students not to post or send any threats against a school online.

Notable incidents 
 2006 NFL bomb threat hoax
 2012 University of Pittsburgh bomb threats
 2016 Australian school bomb threats
 2017 Jewish Community Center bomb threats
 October 2018 United States mail bombing attempts
 2018 Bitcoin bomb threats
 2021 Ryanair Flight 4978 bomb threat hoax

See also
 Threat
Bomb
 Death threat 
 Swatting

References

Crimes
Emergency services
Speech crimes
Terrorism tactics
Civil defense